Everyman is a British television documentary series that aired on BBC One in a late-night slot on Sunday evenings between 1977 and 2000. Its subject matter tended to be focused on moral and religious issues, often in the form of a film in which individuals would discuss their thoughts. One edition from 1990, A Game of Soldiers  concerned a group of soldiers exploring their feelings about being trained to kill. Throughout much of its time on air, series of Everyman aired alternately with Heart of the Matter, a debate series which featured somewhat similar topics. Both series were cancelled in the 2000s after the BBC revamped the output of its religious programming.

References

External links
 
 
 

1977 British television series debuts
2000 British television series endings
1970s British documentary television series
1980s British documentary television series
1990s British documentary television series
2000s British documentary television series
BBC television documentaries
English-language television shows